PBE may refer to:
Bayesian game#Perfect Bayesian equilibrium
Population balance equation
Potential buoyant energy or convective available potential energy (CAPE)
Programming by example, in computing
Password-based encryption
Protective Breathing Equipment, smoke hoods on aircraft
Phi Beta Epsilon, an MIT fraternity
Prosopography of the Byzantine Empire